The Matale Municipal Council (Sinhala: මාතලේ මහ නගර සභා mātalē maha nagara sabhāva) is the local council for Matale. It is a large regional city located in the heart of island's central hills, it is the capital and largest city in Matale district.

The council was formed in 1963 under the Municipalities Ordinance Act of 1865. It has 21 elected representatives, comprising ten seats held by the United National Party, four seats by the Sri Lanka Freedom Party and six by Sri Lanka Podujana Peramuna.

Administrative units 
Matale Municipal Council is divided into 52 Grama Niladhari Divisions (GN Divisions).

List of mayors 
The Mayor of Matale is the head of Matale Municipal Council and his office is located at the Matale Town Hall. The current Mayor of Matale is Sandhanam Prakash.

The Municipal Council of Matale provides sewer, road management and waste management services, in case of water, electricity and telephone utility services the council liaises with the Water Supply and Drainage Board, the Ceylon Electricity Board and telephone service providers.

References

External links 

1947 establishments in Ceylon
Matale
Local authorities in Central Province, Sri Lanka
Municipal councils of Sri Lanka